Cardioglossa elegans is a species of frog in the family Arthroleptidae. It is found in southwestern Cameroon, Equatorial Guinea, and south to central Gabon. Common name elegant long-fingered frog has been coined for it.

Description
Adult males measure  and adult females  in snout–vent length. Males have extremely long third fingers. The tympanum is visible. The dorsum is greyish brown and bears small and large symmetrical dark brown blotches with a pale outline. There are three large blotches; the first one is triangular and starts between the eyes, pointing backwards. Another two blotches follow immediately behind.

Habitat and conservation
Cardioglossa elegans occur in moist lowland and degraded forests at elevations below . Breeding takes place in small streams, and males call from rocky areas or from under bridges.

Cardioglossa elegans  is a common species where it occurs, especially when aggregating for breeding. It can probably suffer locally from habitat loss. It is likely to occur in several protected areas.

References

elegans
Frogs of Africa
Amphibians of Cameroon
Amphibians of Equatorial Guinea
Amphibians of Gabon
Taxa named by George Albert Boulenger
Amphibians described in 1906
Taxonomy articles created by Polbot